Eruh District is a district of Siirt Province in Turkey which has the town of Eruh as its seat. The district had a population of 18,101 in 2021.

Settlements 
The district encompasses the town of Eruh, fifty-six villages and eighteen hamlets.

Villages 

 Akdiken
 Akmeşe
 Bağğöze
 Ballıkavak
 Bayırüzü
 Bayramlı
 Bilgili
 Bingöl
 Bozatlı
 Bozkuş
 Bölüklü
 Budamış
 Cintepe
 Çeltiksuyu
 Çetinkol
 Çırpılı
 Çimencik
 Çizmeli
 Dadaklı
 Dağdüşü
 Dalkorur
 Demiremek
 Dikboğaz
 Dönerdöver
 Ekinyolu
 Erenkaya
 Gedikaşar
 Gelenkardeş
 Gölgelikonak
 Gönülaldı
 Görendoruk
 Gülburnu
 Karadayılar
 Kaşıkyayla
 Kavakgölü
 Kekliktepe
 Kılıçkaya
 Kuşdalı
 Narlıdere
 Okçular
 Ortaklı
 Oymakılıç
 Özlüpelit
 Payamlı
 Salkımbağlar
 Savaşköy
 Tünekpınar
 Ufaca
 Üzümlük
 Yanıkses
 Yanılmaz
 Yediyaprak
 Yelkesen
 Yerliçoban
 Yeşilören
 Yokuşlu

References 

Districts of Siirt Province